The Silver Bear for Best Screenplay is the Berlin International Film Festival's award for achievement in Screenwriting.

Winners

See also
 Cannes Film Festival Award for Best Screenplay

References

External links 

Berlinale website
International Film Festival at IMDB.

Screenplay
 
Screenwriting awards for film